Giuseppe Gherardeschi (3 November 1759 - 6 August 1815) was an Italian organist and composer. He was born and died in Pistoia.

He began to study music with his father Domenico, who was the maestro di cappella at Pistoia Cathedral, and his uncle Filippo Maria Gherardeschi. He continued his studies with Nicola Sala in Naples at the Conservatorio della Pietà dei Turchini. On returning to his home city he was appointed organist at the Church of Santa Maria dell'Umiltà and later succeeded his father as director of music at Pistoia Cathedral.

As a composer he wrote vocal music (sacred and secular) as well as instrumental music (solo, chamber and orchestral).

Works

Vocal music

Secular Music 
Daliso e Delmita (opera, 1782)
Angelica e Medoro (cantata, 1783)
L'apparenza inganna (opera, 1784)
L'ombra di Catilina (cantata, 1789)
L'impazienza (cantata, 1798)
La speranza coronata (cantata, 1804–1809)
Other arias, duest and choral works

Sacred Music 
Il sacrificio di Jeft (oratorio, 1803)
30 Masses
37 Lamentations
90 Motets
5 Te Deum
Altri lavori sacri minori

Instrumental Music 
6 sonatas for harpsichord or fortepiano and violin obbligato
Several concertoni
Quintet for wind instruments
7 symphonies
6 trios for 2 violins and violoncello (1784)
2 sonatas for harpsichord
Numerous organ works
Other minor works

Bibliography 
U. Pineschi - Giuseppe Gherardeschi di Pistoja: compositore, maestro di cappella e organista - Pistoia, 1999
Giuseppe Gherardeschi, Le Opere per Organo, edited by Umberto Pineschi, Fondazione Accademia di Musica Italiana per Organo, 2009

Discography 
Musica barocca italiana per organo, Giuseppe Gherardeschi - Rondo and Sonata per organo a giusa di banda militare che suona una marcia - Ton Koopman - Música CEV 196
Tra Sacro e Profano: unpublished 18th century Italian works - Sonata per organo a giusa di banda militare che suona una marcia and Versetti per organo a pieno e concertati in tutti i toni – Claudio Brizi - Arts 475802
Gargoyles and Chimeras: Exotic Works for Organ - Sonata per organo a giusa di banda militare che suona una marcia – David Britton – Delos DE3077
Catherine Todorovski: All’Italiana - Versetti per organo a pieno e concertati in tutti i toni - Atma – ACD22110
King of Instruments: A listener's guide to the art and science of recording the organ – March – David Britton – Delos DE3503
Gherardeschi: Responsori e Requiem – Bongiovanni – GB2350
Gherardeschi: Messa per organo - Luigi Ferdinando Tagliavini - fonè 93 F 22CD

1759 births
1815 deaths
Italian organists
Male organists
Italian composers
Italian male composers